The 2023 Big East women's basketball tournament was the postseason women's basketball tournament for the Big East Conference to be held March 3 to 6, 2023, at Mohegan Sun Arena in Uncasville, Connecticut. After four days of play, the #1 seed UConn Huskies defeated #2 seed Villanova Wildcats 67–56, thereby receiving the conference's automatic bid to the 2023 NCAA tournament.

Seeds 
All 11 Big East schools were scheduled to participated in the tournament. Teams were seeded by conference record with tie-breaking procedures to determine the seeds for teams with identical conference records. The top five teams received first-round byes. Seeding for the tournament was determined at the close of the regular conference season.

Schedule

Bracket 

Note: * denotes overtime

References 

Tournament
Big East women's basketball tournament
Big East women's basketball tournament
Big East women's basketball tournament
2020s in Connecticut
Women's sports in Connecticut
College basketball tournaments in Connecticut
Sports competitions in Uncasville, Connecticut